Phùng Quán (January 1932 in Hương Thủy, Thừa Thiên-Huế – 22 January 1995) was a Vietnamese novelist and poet. He was one of the poets associated with the Nhân Văn-Giai Phẩm movement though attacks against himself and his novel “Vượt Côn Đảo” (Escape from Côn Đảo) began two years before that movement was closed down. Masterpiece of Spring in February 1956

Works
 Tuôi thơ dữ dội (Stormy childhood) 7 novel series

References

Vietnamese male poets
1932 births
1995 deaths
Nhân Văn–Giai Phẩm affair
20th-century Vietnamese poets
20th-century male writers